Ahmed Saleh (born 3 March 1977) is an Egyptian former footballer who played in the right defender position.

Honours 
Zamalek
 Egyptian Premier League: 2001, 2003, 2004
 Egypt Cup: 2002
 Egyptian Super Cup: 2001, 2002
 CAF Champions League: 2002
 African Cup Winners' Cup: 2000
 CAF Super Cup: 2003
 Arab Champions Cup: 2003
 Saudi-Egyptian Super Cup: 2003

External links
 Ahmed Saleh at Footballdatabase

1977 births
Living people
Zamalek SC players
Egyptian footballers
Place of birth missing (living people)
Egyptian Premier League players
Association football defenders